Joseph Sargent (born Giuseppe Danielle Sorgente; July 22, 1925 – December 22, 2014) was an American film director. Though he directed many television movies, his best known feature-length works were arguably the action movie White Lightning starring Burt Reynolds, the biopic MacArthur starring Gregory Peck, and the horror anthology Nightmares. His most popular feature film was the subway thriller The Taking of Pelham One Two Three. Sargent won four Emmy Awards over his career.

He is the father of voice actress Lia Sargent.

Life and career
Sargent was born Giuseppe Danielle Sorgente in Jersey City, New Jersey, the son of Italians Maria (née Noviello) and Domenico Sorgente. Sargent served in the U.S. Army during World War II, where he fought in the Battle of the Bulge. Sargent began his career as an actor, appearing in numerous films and television programs.

He appeared in an uncredited role as a soldier in the film From Here to Eternity (1953) where he also met his first wife Mary Carver on the set. In the mid 1950s Sargent switched to directing; over the next 15 years his directing credits would include episodes of television series Lassie, The Invaders (four episodes), The Man from U.N.C.L.E. and the Star Trek episode "The Corbomite Maneuver". 

He appeared in the Western series Gunsmoke, once in 1957 as a man, turned drunk, who lost his drive to live, in the episode “Skid Row” (S2E22); then again as a drunk cowboy who gets killed in The Longbranch Saloon in the 1959 episode “”There Never Was A Horse” (S4 E35).

In 1969, he directed his first feature, the science fiction thriller Colossus: The Forbin Project. In 1971, he was hired to direct Buck and the Preacher but, after a few days of shooting, was replaced by Sidney Poitier who cited creative differences. The next year, however, he directed The Man, starring James Earl Jones, which was begun as a television movie.

He alternated between television movies and feature films during the 1970s. Sargent's directorial work from this period includes; The Taking of Pelham One Two Three, the TV movies Hustling with Lee Remick and Jill Clayburgh, Maybe I'll Come Home in the Spring with Sally Field and Tribes with Jan-Michael Vincent and Darren McGavin, as well as international award-winning ABC film The Night That Panicked America. In 1974, he won his first Directors Guild of America Award for The Marcus-Nelson Murders (1973), which was the TV movie pilot for the Kojak series.

In the 1980s, Sargent directed mini-series Manions of America, which featured Pierce Brosnan, and Space.
In 1987 he directed Jaws: The Revenge, the third sequel to Steven Spielberg's 1975 classic. The film received entirely negative reviews. Roger Ebert called his directing of the climactic sequence "incompetent," and he was nominated for Worst Director in the 1987 Golden Raspberry Awards.

He concentrated on TV movies after Jaws: The Revenge, including The Karen Carpenter Story, The Long Island Incident, Dostoevsky's Crime and Punishment and the 2007 remake of Sally Field docudrama Sybil.

Joseph Sargent and his wife Carolyn Nelson Sargent laid the groundwork for Deaf West Theatre.

Sargent spent time as the Senior Filmmaker-in-Residence for the Directing program at the American Film Institute Conservatory in Los Angeles.

Sargent died of complications from heart disease at his home in Malibu, California, on December 22, 2014. He was 89.

Filmography

One Spy Too ManyRe-edit of a two-part The Man from U.N.C.L.E. episodes Alexander the Greater Affair with different shots and dialog.

The Spy in the Green HatRe-edit of a two-part The Man from U.N.C.L.E. episodes The Concrete Overcoat Affair with new scenes added.

Awards 
Sargent was nominated for several Emmy awards. He won four.  Early in his career, he won a Directors Guild of America award for the Kojak pilot. Sargent was nominated for eight DGA awards for television movies, more than any other director in this category.

20th century 
Tribes

 Nominated for the Primetime Emmy Award for Outstanding Directing for a Limited Series, Movie, or Dramatic Special

The Marcus-Nelson Murders

 Winner of Primetime Emmy Award for Outstanding Directing for a Limited Series, Movie, or Dramatic Special
 Won the Directors Guild of America Award for Outstanding Directing – Miniseries or TV Film

Amber Waves

 Nominated for Outstanding Directorial Achievement in Drama - A Single Program

Nightmares

 Won the Brussels International Fantastic Film Festival

Love Is Never Silent

 Won the Primetime Emmy Award for Outstanding Directing for a Limited Series, Movie, or Dramatic Special

Space

 Emmy Award, Outstanding Film Sound Mixing for a Limited Series or a Special
 Emmy Award nominee, Outstanding Limited Series
 Artios Award nominee, Best Casting for TV Miniseries

Jaws: The Revenge

 Nominated—Razzie Award for Worst Picture Nominated—Razzie Award for Worst DirectorFinal theatrical film as director

Caroline?

 Won the Primetime Emmy Award for Outstanding Directing for a Limited Series, Movie, or Dramatic Special

Miss Rose White

 Won the Primetime Emmy Award for Outstanding Directing for a Limited Series, Movie, or Dramatic Special

World War II: When Lions Roared

 Nominated for the Directors Guild of America Award for Outstanding Directing – Miniseries or TV Film

Miss Evers' Boys

 Nominated for Directors Guild of America Award for Outstanding Directing – Miniseries or TV Film

A Lesson Before Dying

 Nominated for the Primetime Emmy Award for Outstanding Directing for a Limited Series, Movie, or Dramatic Special

21st century 
For Love or Country: The Arturo Sandoval Story

 Nominated for Directors Guild of America Award for Outstanding Directing – Miniseries or TV Film

Something the Lord Made

 Directors Guild of America Award for Outstanding Directing in a Television Film
 Nominated for the Primetime Emmy Award for Outstanding Directing for a Limited Series, Movie, or Dramatic Special

Warm Springs

 Won the Directors Guild of America Award for Outstanding Directing – Miniseries or TV Film
 Nominee for a Primetime Emmy for Primetime Emmy Award for Outstanding Directing for a Limited Series, Movie, or Dramatic Special

References

External links
 
 Includes details of awards.

1925 births
2014 deaths
Film producers from New Jersey
American television directors
Artists from Jersey City, New Jersey
Directors Guild of America Award winners
Primetime Emmy Award winners
Film directors from New Jersey